Lohmann is a manufacturer of adhesive tape systems and adhesives for industry. The Lohmann Tape Group focuses on the core markets consumer goods and electronics, transportation, graphics, building and renewables, hygiene and medical.

Technologies 
In 1938, Lohmann went into the production of double-sided adhesive tapes. To this day, this is the company’s core business with about 1440 patents for adhesive bonds filed for thus far.

Nowadays, the line of business consists of more than just double-sided adhesive tapes: In 1951, the graphics market was tapped into. With the product range DuploFLEX, tapes for the printing industry were now available as well. In 2006, Lohmann-koester developed elastic side panels for diapers (diaper ears).

After about two years of construction, the TEC Center at the Neuwied headquarter was inaugurated in autumn of 2016. On more than 1200 m² it offers room for state-of-the-art laboratories, conference rooms as well as the so-called Bonding Arena, an application laboratory.  Furthermore, the TEC Center is the home of the High Performance Coating Line, a modern coating machine. The most recent invention is the “UV-LUX technology”, the world’s first UV-light activatable adhesive tape solution with color change.

History 
The company was founded in Frankfurt am Main by Julius Lüscher in 1851. The line of business was the import and sale of chemicals for use in dyeworks and for the production of medicines. 1870 August Lohmann took over the management of this company. Later the company looked for a new location, which was then found in Neuwied, Germany. 1938 Lohmann started the production of double-sided adhesive tapes. Today the Lohmann Tape Group is still headquartered in Neuwied, Germany.

In 1998, the Lohmann corporate areas Non-woven and Medical became independent legal entities. The latter was incorporated into a joint enterprise with the Austrian company Rauscher. Today, Lohmann & Rauscher is an important provider of medical products. Lohmann is nowadays a manufacturer of single-sided and double-sided adhesive tape systems and adhesive solutions for industry. Today the Lohmann Tape Group has 1800 employees worldwide, coating plants at six sites in Europe, Asia and America, 19 subsidiaries and sales partners in over 50 countries. The Company Claim is "The Bonding Engineers" and the company is currently headed by Jörg Pohlman and Carsten Herzhoff .

Expansion 
1991 Acquisition of KOESTER GmbH & Co. KG in Altendorf. Lohmann-koester is a manufacturer of self-adhesive and mechanical closures for diapers and incontinence pads. Besides skin-compatible hotmelt adhesives and adhesive tape solutions for hygiene, medical and technical applications.
Lohmann has been active in the United Kingdom since 1992. Lohmann Technologies UK is based in Buckinghamshire and offers tailor-made technical adhesive solutions for manufacturers, designers and OEM customers.
1998 Lohmann has acquired full ownership of Metafol GmbH & Co. KG of Remscheid. Adhesive tape processing, adhesive tape converting and die-cutting processes are the main skills of the present Lohmann GmbH & Co.KG site.
Lohmann also expanded further in America at the start of 2004.

Trademarks:
DuploCOLL, 
DuploFLEX, 
DuploMED,
DuploTEC,

References

External links 
 Lohmann history

Manufacturing companies of Germany
Manufacturing companies established in 1851
German companies established in 1851